6 Lacertae is a binary star system in the northern constellation of Lacerta, located around 1,900 light years from the Sun. It is visible to the naked eye as a dim, blue-white hued star with a combined apparent visual magnitude of 4.52. The system is moving closer to the Earth with a heliocentric radial velocity of −9 km/s, and is a suspected member of the Lac OB1 association.

This system forms a single-lined spectroscopic binary with an orbital period of 880 days and an eccentricity of 0.3. The visible component has a stellar classification of B2 IV, matching a B-type subgiant star. It is about 16 million years old with a relatively high projected rotational velocity of 70 km/s. The star has 12.5 times the mass of the Sun and about 7 times the Sun's radius. It is radiating a net 34,590 times the Sun's luminosity from its photosphere at an effective temperature of 21,150 K.

References

B-type subgiants
Spectroscopic binaries
Lacerta (constellation)
Durchmusterung objects
Lacertae, 06
213420
111104
8579